Praha-Vysočany railway station is a mainline railway station located in Vysočany, Prague 9. Located at the northeastern end of Nové spojení, it is a junction between track 070, to Turnov, and track 231 to Kolín via Nymburk. Historically, trains from Nymburk terminated at the now demolished Praha-Těšnov railway station. It is located within walking distance of Vysočanská station on the Prague Metro.

History 
 1872 – station opens under the name Vysočany on the Neratovice – Prague railway.
 1873 – service between Hradec Králové, Nymburk and Prague commences as part of the Austrian Northwestern Railway
 1922 – Vysočany becomes part of Prague
 1941 – station renamed Praha-Vysočany

Services 

Vysocany
Praha-Vysocany